The Carlstadt-East Rutherford Regional School District is a regional public high school and school district serving students in ninth through twelfth grades from both Carlstadt and East Rutherford, two relatively small communities in Bergen County, New Jersey, United States.

As of the 2018–19 school year, the district, comprised of one school, had an enrollment of 516 students and 37.2 classroom teachers (on an FTE basis), for a student–teacher ratio of 13.9:1.

The district is classified by the New Jersey Department of Education as being in District Factor Group "CD", the sixth-highest of eight groupings. District Factor Groups organize districts statewide to allow comparison by common socioeconomic characteristics of the local districts. From lowest socioeconomic status to highest, the categories are A, B, CD, DE, FG, GH, I and J.

Starting in 2014, the district began discussions with the Wallington Public Schools for a proposal in which the 350 Wallington students attending Wallington High School would be added to the 500 already attending Becton Regional High School for grades 9-12. The consolidation would allow for Wallington High School to be reused for other purposes, avoids the need to build a new high school building and could allow for elimination of duplicate administrators.

In March 2020, the Maywood Public Schools received approval from the New Jersey Department of Education to end the relationship it had established with the Hackensack Public Schools in 1969 to send students to Hackensack High School. Maywood will begin transitioning incoming ninth graders to Henry P. Becton Regional High School beginning in the 2020–21 school year. The transition would be complete after the final group of twelfth graders graduates from Hackensack High School at the end of the 2023–24 school year. Maywood cited costs of nearly $14,800 per student in 2018 to send high-school students to Hackensack and an annual cost in excess of $15,000 under a proposed new three-year agreement, while Becton would start at a per-pupil cost of $10,500 in 2020–21 as part of a ten-year deal that would have a maximum cost per Maywood student of $11,800 in the final year of the agreement.

School
Schools in the district (with 2018–19 enrollment from the National Center for Education Statistics) are:
Henry P. Becton Regional High School (commonly referred to as "Becton") is located in East Rutherford and had 491 students in grades 9-12.
Dr. Dario Sforza, Principal

Administration
Core members of the district's / school's administration are:
Dr. Dario Sforza, Superintendent
Nicholas Annitti, School Business Administrator  / Board Secretary

Board of education
The district's board of education, comprised of nine members, sets policy and oversees the fiscal and educational operation of the district through its administration. As a Type II school district, the board's trustees are elected directly by voters to serve three-year terms of office on a staggered basis, with three seats up for election each year held (since 2012) as part of the November general election. The board appoints a superintendent to oversee the day-to-day operation of the district. Seats on the board of education are allocated based on the population of the constituent municipalities, with five seats allocated to East Rutherford and four to Carlstadt.

References

External links 
Carlstadt-East Rutherford Regional School District

Data for Henry P. Becton Regional High School, National Center for Education Statistics

Carlstadt, New Jersey
East Rutherford, New Jersey
New Jersey District Factor Group CD
School districts in Bergen County, New Jersey